Amine Bannour (born 21 February 1990)  is a Tunisian handball player for Saudi Arabian club Mudhar and the Tunisia national team.

Achievements 
IHF Super Globe:
Finalist: 2014
African Champions League:
Winner: 2014
Third place: 2013
African Supercup:
Winner: 2015
Arab Championship of Champions:
Winner: 2012 
Tunisian League:
Winner: 2015
Tunisian Cup:
Winner: 2011, 2015, 2016
Romanian League:
Winner: 2019, 2022
Romanian Supercup: 
Winner: 2018, 2019
African Championship:
Gold Medalist: 2012, 2018
Pan Arab Games: 
Bronze Medalist: 2011
Junior World Championship:
Bronze Medalist: 2011

Individual awards  
 IHF Super Globe Top Scorer: 2012
 All-Star Right Back of the African Championship: 2012
 All-Star Right Back of the Liga Națională: 2019
 Liga Națională Foreign Player of the Season: 2019

References

External links

1990 births
Living people
People from Mahdia
Tunisian male handball players
CS Dinamo București (men's handball) players
Olympic handball players of Tunisia
Handball players at the 2012 Summer Olympics 
Handball players at the 2016 Summer Olympics
Expatriate handball players
Tunisian expatriate sportspeople in France
Tunisian expatriate sportspeople in Romania
Tunisian expatriate sportspeople in Qatar 
Tunisian expatriate sportspeople in Saudi Arabia
Competitors at the 2013 Mediterranean Games
Competitors at the 2018 Mediterranean Games
Competitors at the 2022 Mediterranean Games
Mediterranean Games silver medalists for Tunisia
Mediterranean Games medalists in handball
20th-century Tunisian people
21st-century Tunisian people